Marco Antonio Rivera Useche (1895–1990) was a Venezuelan musician and composer. He was born in San Cristóbal on 19 June 1895 and died on 15 July 1990. He married Juanita Moreno Morales, with whom he had five children in 1937.

Education
Rivera was of humble origins. After completing primary education he began to work, eventually practicing the trades of carpentry, jewelry, heraldry and shoemaking. In 1910 he began studying music with the Italian master Nicolas Constantino Chicaroni (Vironto, Italy, 1857 - San Cristóbal, 1927), who had arrived in San Cristóbal in the company of other Italian musicians to be incorporated into the Táchira State Band, including Angelo Mottola (1881-1966), author the state Hymn of Anzoátegui.

Career
From 1912 Rivera became a full member of the TáchiraState band and from 1913 he started to receive a salary of Bs 100 per month. In 1916 he was exiled for a short period in Colombia for a confrontation with the president of the state, Eustace Gomez, cousin to the president of Venezuela, Juan Vicente Gómez. On his return he began to study English with a German professor named Sildner.

He again went into exile in Colombia in 1919 but continued his musical studies there. He returned to Venezuela to join a band in Maracaibo with the misfortune that Eustace Gomez was present at the premiere of the band, who had him arrested along with other Tachira musicians. He was taken to San Cristóbal and imprisoned for two years.

During his confinement he began composing his first waltz, and on his release in 1921 he moved back to Maracaibo where he contracted malaria. While in Maracaibo and through an American friend, he studied orchestration and harmony by correspondence in an American school. He returned to San Cristóbal in 1924 where he dedicated himself to the composition of waltzes, fox trot, and bambucos. In 1927, on the death of Nicolas Constantine who also directed the Infantil de la Iglesia band, the pastor, Maldonado, made Rivera responsible for the management of this band. He also took charge of the Táchira Band from 1929.

Legacy
Rivera was co-founder of the Táchira School of Music, directed by his cousin Luis Felipe Ramón y Rivera. Among his extensive work is the San Cristóbal State hymn. In 1934 he founded the state Chamber Orchestra. He was among the founders of the Atheneum Reading Room of Táchira, an initiative of Charles Rangel Lamus. Following a trip to America to attend a meeting of bands, he conceived the idea of changing the band into on the Symphonic Concert Band; this he achieved in 1966. In 1968 he retired from the position of band director and retired to San Pedro del Río.

Marco Antonio Rivera Useche left a long list of musical production in various genres, including bambuco, waltz, fox trot, fantasies for concert, contradance, the galerón, hymns, intermezzo, joropo, overtures and marches. Today the Official Concert Band of Táchira is named after him.

References

Venezuelan composers
Male composers
1895 births
1990 deaths
People from San Cristóbal, Táchira
20th-century composers
20th-century male musicians